Sam W. Whiteman (born September 29, 1901, date of death unknown) was an American football fullback/halfback in the first American Football League for the Chicago Bulls in 1926. Whiteman went to Richmond, Missouri High School and the University of Missouri where he was a 3 year letterman in football.

External links
Sam Whiteman Bio
Stats

References 

1901 births
Year of death missing
People from Richmond, Missouri
American football fullbacks
American football halfbacks
Missouri Tigers football players
Chicago Bulls (American football) players